Camille Charles Jules Debert (1866–1935) was a French sculptor.

Debert was born in Bailleul, Nord, in 1866, the son of Charles Debert, a master sculptor who had a studio in the rue de Lille. Early studies in Bailleul and Bruges were followed by a period at the École des Beaux-Arts in Lille and finally Paris. Military service in 1891 saw him posted to Nancy, a centre for the arts, and there in the army barracks he was commissioned to create a statue of Turenne. Once he had completed his military service, he returned to Paris and worked in the studio of Jules Cavelier. With his cousin Constant Sonneville, an architect, he entered a competition to design a monument dedicated to the French soldiers killed at Antwerp in 1832, and they won it and were given the commission.  However, the city of Antwerp refused to erect the monument, which now stands in Tournai.   At the young age of 27, Debert was recognised by the Salon des Artistes Francais and executed a statue entitled "À la source".  In the early 20th century he was based in his studio at 4, rue Franquet, Paris, and from there, with a team of assistants, he worked in wood, marble, bronze and stone. Among his work was a bust of General Cheroutre, who had been Governor of Corsica and was buried in Bailleul's cemetery. For the town of Meteren he sculpted the bust of Pierre De Coninck in 1911 and that of Commandant Clemmer.  For the Bishop of Moulins he created a medallion for his funeral plaque in Bergues. Debert is regarded above all as a religious sculptor and one of his most celebrated works is his relief carving of a Flemish peasant woman at prayer. This work in bronze was entitled "En Flandres".  Debert also worked on the creation of church altars, tympani and other church furnishings for churches in and around Bailleul. As with so many sculptors after the end of the Great War in 1918,  Debert found himself working on numerous monument aux morts and some of these are described below.

War Memorials

Other works

References 

1866 births
1935 deaths
People from Bailleul, Nord
20th-century French sculptors
19th-century French sculptors
French male sculptors
19th-century French male artists